The 1987 College Football All-America team is composed of college football players who were selected as All-Americans by various organizations and writers that chose College Football All-America Teams in 1987. The National Collegiate Athletic Association (NCAA) recognizes five selectors as "official" for the 1987 season. They are: (1) the American Football Coaches Association (AFCA); (2) the Associated Press (AP) selected based on the votes of sports writers at AP newspapers; (3) the Football Writers Association of America (FWAA); (4) the United Press International (UPI) selected based on the votes of sports writers at UPI newspapers; and (5) the Walter Camp Football Foundation (WC).  Other notable selectors included Football News the Newspaper Enterprise Association (NEA), Scripps Howard (SH), and The Sporting News (TSN).

Consensus All-Americans
The following charts identify the NCAA-recognized consensus All-Americans for the year 1987 and displays which first-team designations they received.

Offense

Defense

Special teams

Full selections - offense

Quarterbacks 

 Don McPherson, Syracuse (CFHOF) (AFCA, AP-1, FWAA, UPI-1, WC, NEA-1, SH, TSN)
 Troy Aikman, UCLA (CFHOF) (AP-2, UPI-2, NEA-2)
 Steve Taylor, Nebraska (AP-3, FN)

Running backs 

 Lorenzo White, Michigan State (AFCA, AP-2, FWAA, UPI-1, WC, FN, NEA-1, SH)
 Craig Heyward, Pittsburgh (AP-1, FWAA, UPI-1, SH, TSN)
 Gaston Green, UCLA (AFCA, UPI-2, WC, FN, NEA-1)
 Bobby Humphrey, Alabama (AP-3, WC, NEA-2, TSN)
 Thurman Thomas, Oklahoma State (CFHOF) (AP-1, UPI-2)
 Lydell Carr, Oklahoma (NEA-1 [FB])
 Eric Metcalf, Texas (AP-2)
 Jamie Morris, Michigan (NEA-2)
 Mel Bratton, Miami (FL) (NEA-2 [FB])
 Blair Thomas, Penn State (AP-3)

Wide receivers 

 Tim Brown, Notre Dame (CFHOF) (AFCA, AP-1 [return specialist], FWAA [KR/WR], UPI-1, WC, FN, NEA-1, SH, TSN)
 Wendell Davis, LSU (AFCA, AP-2, FWAA, UPI-1, FN, SH, TSN)
 Sterling Sharpe, South Carolina (CFHOF) (AP-3, FWAA, UPI-2, TSN)
 Ernie Jones, Indiana (AP-1)
 Marc Zeno, Tulane (AP-1, UPI-2)
 Guy Liggins, San Jose State (AP-2)
 Michael Irvin, Miami (FL) (NEA-2)
 Terance Mathis, New Mexico (AP-3)

Tight ends 

 Keith Jackson, Oklahoma (CFHOF) (AP-1, FWAA, UPI-1, WC, FN, NEA-2, SH)
 Pat Carter, Florida State (AP-2, UPI-2, NEA-1, TSN)
 Ferrell Edmunds, Maryland (AP-3)

Centers 

 Nacho Albergamo, LSU (AFCA, AP-1, FWAA, UPI-1, WC, SH, TSN)
 Chuck Lanza, Notre Dame (AP-2, UPI-2, FN, NEA-1)
 Jake Young, Nebraska (NEA-2)
 Matt Wilson, Texas A&M (AP-3)

Offensive guards 

 Mark Hutson, Oklahoma  (AFCA, AP-1, FWAA, UPI-1, WC, FN, NEA-1, SH)
 Randall McDaniel, Arizona State (CFHOF) (AFCA, AP-2, FWAA, UPI-1, WC, SH)
 John Phillips, Clemson (AP-2, NEA-1)
 Steve Wisniewski, Penn State (TSN)
 Harry Galbreath, Tennessee (AP-3, UPI-2, NEA-2, TSN)
 Larry Rose, Alabama (NEA-2)
 Eric Andolsek, LSU (AP-3)

Offensive tackles 

 Dave Cadigan, USC  (AP-1, FWAA, UPI-1, WC, NEA-1, SH, TSN)
 Jumbo Elliot, Michigan (AFCA, FWAA, UPI-1, WC)
 John McCormick, Nebraska (AFCA, AP-1 [OG], UPI-2 [OG], FN)
 Paul Gruber, Wisconsin (UPI-2, NEA-1, TSN)
 Stacy Searels, Auburn (AP-1, FN)
 Dave Richards, UCLA (SH)
 Greg Johnson, Oklahoma (AP-2, UPI-2, NEA-2)
 Tony Mandarich, Michigan State (AP-2, FN)
 Louis Cheek, Texas A&M (AP-3)
 Pat Tomberlin, Florida State (AP-3, NEA-2)

Full selections - defense

Defensive linemen 

 Chad Hennings, Air Force (CFHOF) (AFCA, AP-1 [DT], FWAA, UPI-1, WC, FN, NEA-1 [DT], SH, TSN)
 Daniel Stubbs, Miami (AFCA, AP-1 [DT], FWAA, UPI-1, WC, FN, NEA-1 [DE], SH, TSN)
 Tracy Rocker, Auburn (CFHOF) (AP-3 [DT], FWAA, UPI-1, WC, FN, SH)
 Ted Gregory, Syracuse (UPI-1, FWAA, FN, NEA-1 [NG], TSN)
 Neil Smith, Nebraska (AP-2 [DT], NEA-1 [DT], TSN)
 Tony Cherico, Arkansas (AFCA, UPI-2, SH)
 Broderick Thomas, Nebraska (AP-2, UPI-2, WC, NEA-1 [DE])
 Michael Dean Perry, Clemson (FWAA, UPI-2, NEA-2 [DT])
 Darrell Reed, Oklahoma (AP-1 [DE], UPI-2, FN, NEA-2 [DE])
 Mark Messner, Michigan (AP-2 [DT], TSN)
 Roy Hart, South Carolina (AP-2 [NG])
 Burt Grossman, Pittsburgh (NEA-2 [DE])
 Carlton Bailey, North Carolina (NEA-2 [NG])
 Kyle Rappold, Colorado (AP-3 [NG])

Linebackers 

 Chris Spielman, Ohio State (CFHOF) (AFCA, AP-1, FWAA, UPI-1, WC, FN, NEA-1, SH, TSN)
 Aundray Bruce, Auburn (AFCA [DL], UPI-1, WC, NEA-2, SH, TSN)
 Dante Jones, Oklahoma (AFCA, AP-1, UPI-2, SH)
 John Roper, Texas A&M (AP-1 [DE], FWAA, UPI-2)
 Ken Norton Jr. UCLA (AP-3, UPI-1, WC, FN, TSN)
 Paul McGowan, Florida State (AP-1, FN, NEA-1)
 Kurt Crain, Auburn (AP-1)
 Marcus Cotton, USC (NEA-1)
 Chris Gaines, Vanderbilt  (AFCA, AP-2)
 Clifford Charlton, Florida (TSN)
 Ezekial Gadson, Pittsburgh (FWAA)
 Carnell Lake, UCLA (AP-2)
 Ned Bolcar, Notre Dame (AP-2, NEA-2)
 Van Waiters, Indiana (AP-3, UPI-2)
 Bill Romanowski, Boston College (AP-2)
 Jethro Franklin, Fresno State (AP-3)
 John Brantley, Georgia (NEA-2)
 Pete Curkendall, Penn State (AP-3 [DT])
 George Mira Jr., Miami (FL) (AP-3)
 Galand Thaxton, Wyoming (AP-3)

Defensive backs 

 Bennie Blades, Miami (CFHOF) (AFCA, AP-1, FWAA, UPI-1, WC, FN, NEA-1, SH, TSN)
 Deion Sanders, Florida State (CFHOF) (AFCA, AP-1, FWAA, UPI-1, WC, FN, NEA-1, SH, TSN)
 Rickey Dixon, Oklahoma (AP-1, FWAA, UPI-1, SH)
 Chuck Cecil, Arizona (AFCA, AP-2, UPI-1, WC, FN)
 Donnell Woolford, Clemson (AFCA)
 Todd Krumm, Michigan State (UPI-2, SH)
 Jarvis Williams, Florida (WC)
 Gordon Lockbaum, Holy Cross (NEA-1)
 Louis Oliver, Florida (AP-3, UPI-2, TSN)
 Mickey Pruitt, Colorado (AP-2, TSN)
 Brad Edwards, South Carolina (AP-3, UPI-2)
 David Vickers, Oklahoma (AP-2)
 Riccardo Ingram, Georgia Tech (UPI-2, NEA-2)
 Terry McDaniel, Tennessee (NEA-2)
 Gary Richard, Pittsburgh (NEA-2)
 Kip Corrington, Texas A&M (AP-3)

Full selections - special teams

Placekickers 

 David Treadwell, Clemson (AFCA, AP-1, UPI-1, WC, FN, NEA-1, SH, TSN)
 Marty Zendejas, Nevada-Reno (FWAA)
 Gary Gussman, Miami (OH) (AP-2)
 Derek Schmidt, Florida State (AP-3, UPI-2, NEA-2)

Punters 

 Tom Tupa, Ohio State  (AFCA, AP-1, FWAA, UPI-1, WC, NEA-1, SH)
 Scott Tabor, California (AP-3, NEA-2, TSN)
 Barry Helton, Colorado (AP-2)
 Greg Montgomery, Michigan State (UPI-2, FN)

Returners 
 Tim Brown, Notre Dame (CFHOF) (AP-1, FWAA [KR/WR])
 Barry Sanders, Oklahoma State (AP-2, TSN)
 Alan Grant, Stanford (AP-3)

Key 

 Bold – Consensus All-American
 -1 – First-team selection
 -2 – Second-team selection
 -3 – Third-team selection
 CFHOF = College Football Hall of Fame inductee

Official selectors

 AFCA – American Football Coaches Association (AFCA), selected by the members of the AFCA for the Kodak All-America team
 AP – Associated Press
 FWAA – Football Writers Association of America
 UPI – United Press International
 WC – Walter Camp Football Foundation, selected by the nation's college coaches and sports information directors

Other selectors

 FN – Football News
 NEA – Newspaper Enterprise Association, the NEA/World Almanac team, "chosen by a sports panel representing the World Almanac, its 140 co-sponsoring newspapers and its publisher"
 TSN – The Sporting News
 SH – Scripps Howard

See also
 1987 All-Big Eight Conference football team
 1987 All-Big Ten Conference football team
 1987 All-Pacific-10 Conference football team
 1987 All-SEC football team

References 

All-America Team
College Football All-America Teams